Morey’s Piers & Beachfront Waterparks is a classic seaside amusement park located on The Wildwoods' boardwalk in Wildwood and North Wildwood, New Jersey. The park has been family owned and operated since 1969 and is currently run by 2nd generation Morey Brothers, Will and Jack. Morey’s Piers has more than 100 rides and attractions across its three amusement piers and two beachfront waterparks.

Description

Surfside Pier 
Surfside Pier is located at 25th Avenue, in North Wildwood. It was the first of the three piers, opening in 1969 with a giant fiberglass slide that cost 25 cents to ride. The slide was closed at the end of the 2010 season and refurbished as a waterslide at the pier's water park. Surfside Pier includes the Zoom Phloom, AtmosFEAR, The Great Nor'easter, and Runaway Tram.

Mariner's Pier 

In the early mornings of the summer, breakfast can be eaten on the wheel. In June 2011, 11-year-old Abiah Jones died after falling from the Giant Wheel. Since then, a "no single riders" policy was created for when guests ride the ferris wheel to ensure the safety of the guests.

Adventure Pier 
Adventure Pier, located at Spencer Avenue, includes Grand Prix Raceway and the famous wooden coaster The Great White, the Skyscraper ride, a The Spring Shot ride, a Screamin' Swing, a Skycoaster, a maze, helicopter tours, and a  boat tag game.

Ocean Oasis Water Park + Beach Club 
Ocean Oasis Water Park + Beach Club is on the beach behind Surfside Pier. It includes water slides, a lazy river, a hot tub with bar access and a kids area.

Raging Waters Water Park 
Behind Mariner’s Landing is Raging Waters Water Park. It includes two unique kiddie play areas at Shipwreck Shoals and Camp KidTastrophe along with speed slides, a lazy river, Shotgun Falls and an activity pool full of challenges.

History

Surfside Pier 
In 1969, Bill and Will Morey Sr. purchased two lots of boardwalk in North Wildwood at 25th and 26th streets. They called it Morey's Pier and opened that summer with a giant fiberglass slide called the Wipe Out. Guests paid 25 cents to slide down the ride in burlap sacks. Sometime in the mid-2000s, what was referred to as Morey’s Pier was rebranded Surfside Pier by management and continues to go by that name to this day.

Mariner’s Pier 

The Moreys extended their operation in 1976 when they purchased Marine Pier and renamed it Mariner’s Landing. At the time of purchase, the pier was fire-damaged and seven of the existing 12 rides on the pier had to be thrown away. However, the pier kept growing. In 1984, the Moreys purchased the Sea Serpent roller coaster. The late-2010s brought new attractions to the pier, such as a permanent biergarten, a new family friendly rollercoaster called “The Wild Whizzer” and the renaming of Mariner’s Landing to Mariner’s Pier. The new branding is now being used by Morey’s Pier Management.

Raging Waters and Ocean Oasis Waterparks 
In 1985, waterslides were installed on Mariner’s Landing and called Raging Waters waterpark. The waterpark opened a day early due to the ocean pollution. The project was masterminded by designer and architect Fred Langford. A second Raging Waters was built on Surfside Pier in 1988. This park was overhauled and relaunched as Ocean Oasis Water Park & Beach Club in 2006 and features Bonsai Beach, Endless River and various new waterslides.

Adventure Pier 
Fun Pier was purchased and renamed Wild Wheels. The Morey's described it as an "interactive amusement center" with active participation by customers. This pier became home to The Great White, the Skyscraper ride, a The Spring Shot ride, a Screamin' Swing, a Skycoaster, a maze, a boat tag game, batting cages, and the Grand Prix Raceway. In 2006/2007, in conjunction with the new Surfside Pier branding at 26th Avenue, Wild Wheels became Adventure Pier. In 2012, the Skyscraper was relocated to the pier from the old Hunt’s Pier, replacing two rides. The pier began removing smaller rides off the pier around this time as well, such as the Snake Slide, Apache Helicopters and a Carousel. In 2016, the Chambers of Checkers Maze was moved and rebranded to make way for a larger Grand Prix Raceway that will now occupy most of the back pier. In 2020, Morey's announced a gateway project that includes the removal of boat tag, the existing Kohr Brothers' custard stand, and the old "SkyRide" station. In the place of these structures, multiple recycled shipping containers will be retrofitted and home to multiple new eating establishments, including a Curley's Fries and a new Kohr Brothers building. No dates were given, but it is expected to be completed in 2021 or 2022.

The Old Hunt's Pier 
Hunt's Pier was also eventually purchased for more rides and attractions. Hunt's Pier went defunct in 1990 and became Conko's Party Pier in 1991, Ocean Pier in 1993-1994, and was leased by the Catanosos in 1995 and called Atlantic Pier with kiddie rides on the front and the rest of the pier closed off with a white wall, and 1996-1998 Dinosaur Beach with the Golden Nugget Mine Rescue, Long Neck River Log Flume, and Raptor Rapids as the three surviving rides from Hunt's Pier to be reused for Dinosaur Beach. Dinosaur Beach permanently closed Sept. 1998 and was then used for maintenance, storage, and tram-car parking with go-kart rides. The Golden Nugget remained on Hunt's Pier until 2008 when it was purchased by Knoebels' Amusement Resort and restored in their park as the Black Diamond. As of 2021, no announcements have been made to add any attractions, and the pier is instead home to various shopping and eating establishments, a maintenance and storage facility, and a "Ripley's Believe It or Not!"-themed mirror maze.

Rides and attractions

Surfside Pier

Mariner's Landing

Adventure Pier

Former rides

Incidents

The Great Nor'easter 
In August 1995, a 36-year-old employee, Dallas White, was picking up trash in a fenced area beneath the ride and was struck in the head by a passenger's foot and killed. Shortly after this accident, Morey's Piers employed a new restricted section which prevents anyone underneath the ride while it is in motion.

Sea Serpent 
In June 1998, the Sea Serpent roller coaster suffered its first ever accident, injuring 14 of the 23 riders on board, some of whom were stranded upside down. According to Will Morey, chief executive officer of the Morey Organization, the accident was thought to have been due to a wheel coming off a rear axle, causing the coaster train to jerk to a stop midway through the ride, as it was looping backwards.

Giant Wheel 
On Friday June 3, 2011, 11-year-old Abiah Jones, a student at PleasanTech Academy Charter School in Pleasantville, New Jersey, died after falling between 100 and 150 feet from the Giant Wheel. She fell at about 12:30 p.m. and was pronounced dead at 1:14 p.m. at the Cape Regional Medical Center.

Her parents, Twanda and Byron Jones, subsequently filed a lawsuit against the ride's operator.

Investigators were unable to determine how the girl, who was riding alone, got out of the gondola. A report by the state Department of Community Affairs found the ride's restraints to be working properly and suggested that to get out of the car, a passenger probably would have had to stand. The report recommended that children be forbidden from riding the Ferris wheel alone.

SpringShot
In July 2021, a 13-year-old girl from Weatherly, Pennsylvania was struck in the face by a seagull during the ride, but was not injured.

Sea Dragon 
On August 20, 2011, five people were injured as a result of the center mast on the Sea Dragon breaking. One person was sent to the hospital with non life-threatening injuries, while four others had minor injuries that were treated at the scene of the accident. The spokeswoman for Morey's Piers and Beachfront Waterparks did not answer questions from the media regarding the incident.

For the 2012 season, the Sea Dragon has been replaced with a newer model of the same ride called Riptide.

Zoom Phloom 
On July 2, 2010, a child was severely injured on the ride when he had a seizure, which caused him to strike his head on the car he was riding in, making him completely unconscious. Shortly after, the Morey's Piers management forbade guests to ride Zoom Phloom alone.

References

Further reading

External links

Photos of Morey's Piers over the years

 
Amusement parks in New Jersey
Piers in New Jersey
The Wildwoods, New Jersey
Buildings and structures in Cape May County, New Jersey
Tourist attractions in Cape May County, New Jersey
1969 establishments in New Jersey
Family-owned companies of the United States